{{Automatic taxobox 
| image = Glaucosoma_magnificum.jpg
| image_caption = Glaucosoma magnificum
| parent_authority = D. S. Jordan, 1923
| taxon = Glaucosoma
| display_parents = 3
| authority = Temminck & Schlegel, 1843<ref name = CofF>{{Cof record|genid=1795|title='Glaucosoma|access-date=9 April 2020}}</ref>
| type_species = Glaucosoma buergeri| type_species_authority = J. Richardson, 1845
}}Glaucosoma, the pearl perches, are perciform fishes native to the Indian Ocean waters around Australia and the western Pacific Ocean.  This genus is currently the only one assigned to the family Glaucosomatidae'''.

Species
The currently recognized species in this genus are:
 Glaucosoma buergeri J. Richardson, 1845 (deepsea jewfish)
 Glaucosoma hebraicum J. Richardson, 1845 (Westralian dhufish)
 Glaucosoma magnificum (J. D. Ogilby, 1915) (threadfin pearl-perch)
 Glaucosoma scapulare'' E. P. Ramsay, 1881 (pearl perch)

See also
 List of fish families

References

Glaucosomatidae
Marine fish genera
Perciformes genera
Extant Eocene first appearances
Taxa named by Hermann Schlegel
Taxa named by Coenraad Jacob Temminck